The Blue Sky with a White Sun serves as the design for the party flag and emblem of the Kuomintang, the canton of the flag of the Republic of China, the national emblem of the Republic of China, and as the naval jack of the ROC Navy.

In the "Blue Sky with a White Sun" symbol, the twelve rays of the white Sun representing the twelve months and the twelve traditional Chinese hours, each of which corresponds to two modern hours and symbolizes the spirit of progress.

Official description
The national emblem of the Republic of China is officially described in the National Emblem and National Flag of the Republic of China Act:

History of the Blue Sky White Sun design

The "Blue Sky with a White Sun" flag was originally designed by Lu Hao-tung, a martyr of the Republican revolution. He presented his design to represent the revolutionary army at the inauguration of the Society for Regenerating China, an anti-Qing society in Hong Kong, on February 21, 1895.

During the Wuchang Uprising in 1911 that heralded the Republic of China, the various revolutionary armies had different flags. Lu Hao-tung's "Blue Sky with a White Sun" flag was used in the southern provinces of Guangdong, Guangxi, Yunnan, and Guizhou, while the "18-Star Flag", "Five-Colored Flag", and other designs were used elsewhere.

When the government of the Republic of China was established on January 1, 1912, The "Five-Colored" flag was adopted as the national flag, but Sun Yat-sen did not consider its design appropriate, reasoning that horizontal order implied a hierarchy or class like that which existed during dynastic times. Thus, when he established a rival government in Guangzhou in 1917, he brought over the "Blue Sky with a White Sun" flag for the party and the "Blue Sky, White Sun, and a Wholly Red Earth" flag, which was then the naval ensign, for the nation. This officially became the national flag in 1928 while the "Blue Sky with a White Sun" flag was adopted as the naval jack.

The "Blue Sky, White Sun, and a Wholly Red Earth" flag has remained the flag of the Republic of China  to this day.

National emblem and history

Beiyang period

The national emblem of the Republic of China was derived from the Blue Sky with a White Sun flag. The emblem was designed by He Yingqin at Whampoa Military Academy in 1924 and was set as the national emblem by the Law of national flag and national emblem of the Republic of China in 1928.

On the national emblem rays of sun have some distance to the edge, symbolizing the broadness of the sky, while on Kuomintang emblem the rays reach the edge, symbolizing the spirit of revolution is as powerful as the sun.

The national emblem of the Republic of China from 1913 to 1928 is called Twelve Symbols national emblem, based on the traditional symbols on clothes of ancient Chinese emperors. It was designed by Lu Xun, Qian Daosun and Xu Shoushang on August 28, 1912, and was set as national emblem in February 1913. It remained as the national emblem during the Empire of China from 1915 to 1916. After the Northern Expedition it was replaced by the Blue Sky with a White Sun national emblem in 1928.

Nationalist period

Since 1928, under the KMT's political tutelage, the Blue Sky with a White Sun Flag shared the same prominence as the ROC flag. A common wall display consisted of the KMT flag perched on the left and the ROC flag perched on the right, each tilted at an angle with a portrait of National Father Sun Yat-sen displayed in the center. After the promulgation of the Constitution of the Republic of China, the party flag was removed from such a display and the national flag was moved to the center.
To promote a sense of national identity, the design of the national emblem was freely available to use and was featured prominently in corporate logos, art during the era.

Taiwanese period
Since the ROC government moved to Taiwan and especially in the years since the end of martial law the KMT flag has lost some of its prominence. However, it is still frequently seen on KMT party buildings, in political rallies and other meetings of KMT and the pan-blue coalition.

The flag and the symbol made news during the ROC legislative elections of 2004, when President Chen Shui-bian suggested that the Kuomintang's flag and party emblem violated the ROC's National Emblem Law for being too similar to the national emblem of the Republic of China. Chen stated that the law forbids the ROC's emblem and flag from being used by non-governmental organizations and warned that the KMT would have three months to change its flag and emblem if his Democratic Progressive Party won a majority of seats in the legislature. The KMT responded by asking the government to change the national emblem, saying the KMT emblem existed first. However, the pan-green coalition failed to win a majority, and Chen took no action for the remainder of his presidency.

On 29 January 2021, the Legislative Yuan passed a resolution proposed by the New Power Party on 29 January instructing the Ministry of the Interior (MOI) to look into ways of addressing the issue of the similarity between the national emblem, in use since 1928 for all of China, and the KMT party flag. The MOI responded that through their analysis of the current situation, the change "should not be taken lightly," though suggesting that symbols of political parties could be changed.

Use in other countries
The design of "Blue Sky with a White Sun" was used in the unit insignia or coats of arms of some units of the United States Army that fought in World War II. The most famous unit was Merrill's Marauders (officially named the "5307th Composite Unit (Provisional)"), which has the "Blue Sky with a White Sun" as part of its badge. The usage by US troops was a result of cooperation between US and Chinese Expeditionary Force in the China Burma India Theater. Postwar US military units stationed in Taiwan, including the United States Taiwan Defense Command (USTDC) and the Military Assistance Advisory Group (MAAG), also used the design in their badges.

Up to now, the "Blue Sky with a White Sun" can still be seen in the emblem of the US Army 75th Ranger Regiment.

Other emblems

Historical Taiwanese emblems
Taiwan's earliest emblems were used during the European periods.

In 1895, Taiwan was annexed by Japan. The emblem was worn as an official clothing of the Governor's Office in Taiwan which featured a Daijishō with a Sycamore leaf and chrysanthemum branch in a brown circle.

After the end of Japanese period, Taiwan was transferred to the Republic of China which adopted the Blue Sky with a White Sun emblem. This symbol remains in use to this day in Taiwan and by the Kuomintang.

Chinese Taipei

After the People's Republic of China became an IOC member, the ROC began to use the name Chinese Taipei for its competitions. The crest of the Chinese Taipei Olympic Committee includes symbols of the Olympic Committee and the Chinese Taipei team. At the periphery is a stylized plum blossom that symbolizes the National Flower of the Republic of China. The center of the emblem contains the Olympic rings and the Blue Sky with a White Sun (note that the proportion of the blue field is between that of the National Emblem of the Republic of China and the Party Emblem of the Kuomintang). The Olympic flag of Chinese Taipei depicts the emblem on a white field.

Subdivisions

Provinces (streamlined)

Counties

Gallery

See also 
 Kuomintang
 History of the Republic of China
 Politics of the Republic of China
 Chinese Taipei
 Emblem of the Communist Party of China
 National Emblem of the People's Republic of China
 Flag of the Republic of China
 Proposed flags of Taiwan

References

Citations

Sources

External links 

 Kuomintang Official Website
 sac.gov.tw:本期專題：奧會模式

National symbols of Taiwan
Taiwan
Heraldic charges
Coats of arms with suns
Chinese heraldry
Flags of organizations
National symbols of China
Kuomintang
National symbols of the Republic of China (1912–1949)
Coats of arms of states with limited recognition